Stockton Brook railway station is a disused railway station in Staffordshire.

History
The Stoke–Leek line was opened by the North Staffordshire Railway (NSR) in 1867 but it was not until 1896 that a station to serve the village of Stockton Brook was built.  Situated on the single track section of the line between Milton Junction (where the line diverged from the Biddulph Valley line) and Endon, the station had only a single platform situated in a shallow cutting.  The station buildings were at street level.  During the LMS period the station was known as Stockton Brook for Brown Edge.

Passenger services over the line were withdrawn in 1956 and the station closed.  The station buildings remain in existence and are now a shop.  The line through the station continued in use until 1988 for freight services and since then the line has officially been out of use but not closed.

Route

Stationmasters
Below is a list of stationmasters for Stockton Brook Railway Station.
 Mr Hudson (1918)

References
Notes

Sources
 
 
 

Disused railway stations in Stoke-on-Trent
Former North Staffordshire Railway stations
Railway stations in Great Britain closed in 1956
Railway stations in Great Britain opened in 1896